Sarkar may refer to:

 Sarkar (surname), including a list of people with the name
 Sarkar (film series), a series of Indian political crime thriller films
 Sarkar (2005 film), the first film in the series
 Sarkar (2018 film), an Indian Tamil-language film
 Sarkar (soundtrack), a soundtrack album from the 2018 film
 Sarkar (country subdivision), a historical administrative unit, mostly in the Mughal states of India
 25630 Sarkar, a main-belt asteroid

See also
 Sərkar (disambiguation), several places in Azerbaijan
 Sircar, a list of people with the surname
 Sorcar, a list of people from the same family